Mayra Duque  is a Guatemalan activist and the former First Lady of Guatemala from 1993 until 1996. She is the second wife of the President of Guatemala, Ramiro de León Carpio.

After the events that occurred during the "Serranazo", the Constitutional Court declared the mandate of Jorge Serrano Elías null. At that time, Ramiro de León served as Ombudsman, the security forces kept in custody the residence of the prosecutor as part of the censorship imposed by President Serrano. Later, Serrano left Guatemala for Panama and immediately the Congress met to elect the Acting President who would conclude Serrano's term.

Ramiro de León Carpio was elected Acting President and was sworn into office at dawn on June 5, 1993. Mayra Duque accompanied President Ramiro de León in ceremonial events and followed up on social activities in the Secretariat of Social Work of the Spouse of the President.

References

Living people
Date of birth missing (living people)
Year of birth missing (living people)
First ladies of Guatemala
20th-century Guatemalan women politicians
20th-century Guatemalan politicians